Ronald E. Avery (September 22, 1956 – February 23, 2019) was an American sport shooter and firearms instructor who took bronze in the Standard division at the 2002 IPSC Handgun World Shoot and bronze in the Standard division Senior category at the 2014 IPSC Handgun World Shoot. He also took the Standard division title in the 2013 IPSC US Handgun Championship and the Limited-10 division title at the 2000 USPSA Handgun Nationals.

Ron focused most of his instruction on developing a doctrine for shooting called "Reactive Shooting Science", which he termed "the earliest way to get a hit and then do it again".  His primary life interest was in "helping the good guys win", so he focused on creating a doctrine that was competitive but always tactically sound.  He taught for various academies, for his own Practical Shooting Academy, and in 2013 founded the Tactical Performance Center as a destination training academy centered around developing and teaching Reactive Shooting. He and others at the school created numerous videos on the Tactical Performance Center YouTube channel that document the details of Reactive Shooting.

In 2007 Ron did a shooting seminar and practical course for the Bulgarian IPSC team who was going to participate in the World Shoot France same year. Also and another dozen of top shooters and law enforcement/military from the same country participated. For them it was a big eye opener and they are very grateful and honored. 

Ron died on February 23, 2019, at the age of 62 from cancer,  and was remembered at the 2019 USPSA National Championship in St. George, Utah on Sept 24 2019.

See also 
 Rob Leatham
 Brian Enos

References 

1956 births
2019 deaths
American male sport shooters
IPSC shooters
21st-century American people
20th-century American people